Sun Chuo (320-377) was a Chinese poet of the Six Dynasties poetry tradition. He was one of the famous participants of the Orchid Pavilion Gathering, along with Wang Xizhi, and a large group of other scholar-poets, in 353 CE, in Shan-yin (now part of the modern province of Zhejiang). Sun Chuo is also famous for a fu upon the topic of Mount Tiantai, as well as his pioneering work on Chinese landscape poetry He was considered the foremost man of letters of his day.

Poetry
One of his well-known poems was simply titled "Orchid Pavilion".

See also
Classical Chinese poetry forms
Filial piety
History of graphic design
Lantingji Xu
Orchid Pavilion Gathering
Six Dynasties poetry

Notes

References
 Chang, H. C. (1977). Chinese Literature 2: Nature Poetry. (New York: Columbia University Press). 
 Yip, Wai-lim (1997). Chinese Poetry: An Anthology of Major Modes and Genres . (Durham and London: Duke University Press). 

Jin dynasty (266–420) poets
Writers from Shaoxing
Poets from Zhejiang